PS-97 Korangi Karachi-VI is a constituency of the Provincial Assembly of Sindh.

General elections 2013

General elections 2008

See also
 PS-96 Korangi Karachi-V
 PS-98 Korangi Karachi-VII

References

External links
 Election commission Pakistan's official website
 Awazoday.com check result
 Official Website of Government of Sindh

Constituencies of Sindh